Mustaine is a surname. Notable people with the surname include:

Dave Mustaine (born 1961), American guitarist, singer, songwriter, actor, and author
Dave Mustaine (footballer) (born 1992), Indonesian footballer
Electra Mustaine (born 1998), American recording artist, actress, model, and songwriter